Senator Hollingsworth may refer to:

David Hollingsworth (1844–1929), Ohio State Senate
Dennis Hollingsworth (born 1967), California State Senate

See also
Beverly Hollingworth (born 1935), New Hampshire State Senate